Amy X Neuburg (born Cheltenham, England) is an American composer, vocalist, and electronic musician.

Education and career 
She holds a B.M. degree in voice from the Oberlin Conservatory of Music, a B.A. in linguistics from Oberlin College, and an M.F.A. in electronic music from Mills College, where she studied with Pauline Oliveros and David Rosenboom.

Her solo works combine her singing and speaking voice with electronic loops and samples triggered with electronic drums.  Her multi-layered compositions incorporate musical styles including opera, rock, Medieval music, and world music.  For ten years she led the experimental band Amy X Neuburg & Men. Neuburg's live-looping works incorporate voice and digital instrument samples, and draw upon compositional traditions such as acousmatic voice and the posthuman vocal subject.

More recently Ms. Neuburg's compositions have focused on chamber and vocal ensembles, often with electronics and her own voice as soloist. She has composed for and sung with the Paul Dresher Ensemble, Solstice vocal ensemble, Del Sol String Quartet, Robin Cox Ensemble, Present Music, and Pacific Mozart Ensemble.

From 2005 to 2010 Amy led the Cello ChiXtet, a group she established to perform her song cycle The Secret Language of Subways.

Neuburg lives in Oakland, California.

Discography 
Neuburg's recorded output reflects a polystylistic approach to singing/songwriting.

Solo 
 The Secret Language of Subways
 Residue —2004 (Other Minds)
 Sports! Chips! Booty!
 Utechma
 Songs 91 to 85

References

External links
Amy X Neuburg web page
Amy X Neuburg page from IS Productions site
Amy X Neuburg performs Six Little Stains for solo voice and electronics (2002) at the Other Minds 9 festival, Palace of Fine Arts Theatre, San Francisco, March 6, 2003

American women composers
21st-century American composers
British emigrants to the United States
Living people
Oberlin Conservatory of Music alumni
Avant-garde singers
American women in electronic music
21st-century American women musicians
Year of birth missing (living people)
21st-century women composers